This is a confirmed referenced overview list of notable gay, lesbian or bisexual people, who have either been open about their sexuality or for which reliable sources exist. The number of notables in the list is likely to be several times higher due to fact that many famous people have hidden their sexual orientations. Famous persons who are only thought or rumored to be gay, lesbian or bisexual are not included in this list. 

The definition of sexual orientation has changed greatly over time and the word "gay" was not used to describe sexual orientation until the mid 20th century. A number of different classification schemes have been used to describe sexual orientation since the mid-19th century. Much of the research about sexual orientation has failed to define the term at all, making it difficult to reconcile the results of different studies. 

However, most definitions include a psychological component (such as the direction of an individual's erotic desire) and/or a behavioural component (which focuses on the sex of the individual's sexual partner/s). Some prefer to simply follow an individual's self-definition or identity. See homosexuality and bisexuality for criteria that have traditionally denoted lesbian, gay and bisexual (LGB) people. The high prevalence of people from the West on this list may be due to societal attitudes toward homosexuality. The Pew Research Center's 2013 Global Attitudes Survey found that there is “greater acceptance in more secular and affluent countries,” with "publics in 39 countries [having] broad acceptance of homosexuality in North America, the European Union, and much of Latin America, but equally widespread rejection in predominantly Muslim nations and in Africa, as well as in parts of Asia and in Russia. Opinion about the acceptability of homosexuality is divided in Israel, Poland and Bolivia.”  Americans are divided – a majority (60 percent) believes homosexuality should be accepted, while 33 percent disagree. Attitude towards homosexuality in Latin American countries have increasingly been more legally tolerant, but Mexico and Brazil have remained unaccepting about the subject.

Persons of confirmed lesbian, gay or bisexual orientation
The following list includes notable people who have self-identified as homosexual or bisexual, or whose homosexuality or bisexuality has been backed by sources that are usually considered reliable.

 List of gay, lesbian or bisexual people: A
 List of gay, lesbian or bisexual people: Ba–Bh
 List of gay, lesbian or bisexual people: Bi–Bz
 List of gay, lesbian or bisexual people: C
 List of gay, lesbian or bisexual people: D–E
 List of gay, lesbian or bisexual people: F
 List of gay, lesbian or bisexual people: G
 List of gay, lesbian or bisexual people: H
 List of gay, lesbian or bisexual people: I–J
 List of gay, lesbian or bisexual people: K
 List of gay, lesbian or bisexual people: L
 List of gay, lesbian or bisexual people: M
 List of gay, lesbian or bisexual people: N–O
 List of gay, lesbian or bisexual people: P–Q
 List of gay, lesbian or bisexual people: R
 List of gay, lesbian or bisexual people: Sa–Sc
 List of gay, lesbian or bisexual people: Sd–Si
 List of gay, lesbian or bisexual people: Sj–Sz
 List of gay, lesbian or bisexual people: T–V
 List of gay, lesbian or bisexual people: W–Z

See also
Lists of LGBT people
List of transgender people
Lists of bisexual people
List of people with non-binary gender identities
List of LGBT African Americans
List of LGBT Jews
Lists of LGBT figures in fiction and myth

References

External links
Rob's A-Z of famous gay, lesbian and bisexual people
The gay, lesbian, bisexual, transgender queer encyclopedia – contains entries on thousands of LGBT people.
FemBio – Notable Women International includes biographies of lesbians and a search function, German Version complete, English Version growing

Lists of LGBT-related people